The Prospect Terrace Apartments are a historic apartment complex at 3603 Kavanaugh Boulevard in Little Rock, Arkansas. It is a U-shaped two story brick structure, with a partial concrete basement due to a sloping lot. It is in the austere International Style, with little exterior ornamentation, steel-clad windows, and a flat roof.  It was constructed using a design from Edwin B. Cromwell, who was also the first owner of the apartment complex. The building consists of nineteen different housing units.

The apartments were listed on the National Register of Historic Places in 2002.

See also
National Register of Historic Places listings in Little Rock, Arkansas

References

Houses on the National Register of Historic Places in Arkansas
International style architecture in Arkansas
Houses completed in 1947
Houses in Little Rock, Arkansas
National Register of Historic Places in Little Rock, Arkansas